Michael Lee Falls (born March 3, 1934) is a former American football guard in the National Football League for the Dallas Cowboys. He played college football at the University of Minnesota.

Early years
Falls attended Bemidji High School where he lettered in football and track. In 1952, he won the Region 8 shot put championship.

He accepted a football scholarship from the University of Minnesota. He was a three-year starter, beginning his career as a two-way guard. As a junior, he was moved to tackle. As a senior, he was elected team captain. He also served as the team's placekicker. He played in the 1955 Blue–Gray game.

Professional career

New York Giants
Falls was selected by the New York Giants in the twentieth round (237th overall) of the 1956 NFL Draft, but didn't sign with the team.

Toronto Argonauts
On February 24, 1956, he signed with the Toronto Argonauts of the Interprovincial Rugby Football Union league, which eventually became the Canadian Football League. He played on the offensive line and was also the squad's placekicker. He was cut in October.

New York Giants
In 1959, he was signed as a free agent by the New York Giants. He was released on September 14.

Green Bay Packers
On March 10, 1960, he was signed as a free agent by the Green Bay Packers. He was released on September 19.

Dallas Cowboys
On September 22, 1960, he was claimed off waivers by the Dallas Cowboys. He won the right guard job by mid-season and started 5 games during the franchise's inaugural year. In 1961, he started all 14 games at right guard. He announced his retirement in 1963.

Personal life
After football he initially worked in a public relations job, before being an Episcopal priest for thirty-six years. He was also a teaching associate of John Bradshaw. He was the Chaplain at Austin Recovery, a drug detox in Austin, Texas.

References

1934 births
Living people
People from Bemidji, Minnesota
Players of American football from Minnesota
American football offensive guards
Minnesota Golden Gophers football players
Dallas Cowboys players
Toronto Argonauts players